Diddams is a surname. Notable people with the surname include:

 Harry Diddams (1864–1929), Australian printer and politician
 Nicholas Diddams, (1760–1823), English shipbuilder
 Scott Diddams, American physicist